The South Yorkshire Mayoral Combined Authority is the combined authority for South Yorkshire in England, with powers over transport (public transport and major trunk roads only), economic development and regeneration. It covers a total area of 3484 km2 which is home to a population of 1.8 million. It includes the entirety of the metropolitan county of South Yorkshire as full members, with North East Derbyshire, Derbyshire Dales, Bassetlaw, Chesterfield and Bolsover non-metropolitan Districts as non-constituent members.

The authority's first mayoral election took place on Thursday 3 May 2018, coinciding with the 2018 United Kingdom local elections.

Between April 2014 and May 2018 the authority was known as the Sheffield City Region Combined Authority and then as the Sheffield City Region Mayoral Combined Authority between May 2018 and September 2021 when the present name was adopted.

History

The Sheffield City Region was one of eight city regions defined in the 2004 document Moving Forward: The Northern Way, as a collaboration between the three northern regional development agencies.

In September 2006, the local authorities comprising the Sheffield City Region launched the Sheffield City Region Development Programme. This set out how the local authorities believed that by working together as a city region they could increase the economic output of the area by 12.6% by 2016.

It also described governance structures for the city region, including a City Region Forum (consisting of the Leaders of each of the constituent authorities, including the two county councils and the Peak District National Park Authority, along with observers from the two Regional Development Agencies and Government Offices covering the city region). The City Region Forum has since been formally established, and has resolved to set up four thematic Joint Issue Boards to take forward some of the propositions made in the City Region Development Programme. The four Joint Issue Boards cover transport; Residential Offer (Housing Supply and Demand); Destination Management (Tourism and Inward Investment); and Knowledge Economy and Innovation.

The region began its work properly in 2008, with a development forum created. This was to be headed up by Sylvia Yates, the former director of South Yorkshire Objective One European grants programme before the European funding was lost.

Combined Authority
The Combined Authority was established by statutory instrument under the Local Democracy, Economic Development and Construction Act 2009 on 1 April 2014. The statutory name of the authority is the Barnsley, Doncaster, Rotherham and Sheffield Combined Authority.

A devolution deal was agreed between the government and the Combined Authority in 2015 which committed £900 million for the region and a directly elected mayor of the Sheffield City Region from 2017 onwards.

Following legal action from Derbyshire County Council regarding the inclusion of Derbyshire local authorities, and the withdrawal of Bassetlaw and Chesterfield councils mid-2017, the first mayoral election was delayed until 2018.

Naming
As part of the consultation process for the new authority, the UK government suggested the name South Yorkshire Combined Authority, which was rejected by the authorities who favoured the name Sheffield City Region Combined Authority. The government rejected this name as "misleading and inappropriate". The order presented to parliament to create the authority referred to it as the Barnsley, Doncaster, Rotherham, and Sheffield Combined Authority. The authority subsequently used the corporate name Sheffield City Region Combined Authority between April 2014 and May 2018 when it adopted the name Sheffield City Region Mayoral Combined Authority. In June 2021 the authority agreed to assume the name South Yorkshire Mayoral Combined Authority (SYMCA).

Combined Authority membership
The Combined Authority consists of the four local authorities of South Yorkshire and the directly elected Mayor as constituent members, and the other authorities in the Sheffield City Region as non-constituent partners. Membership numbers are weighted to ensure a majority of South Yorkshire members, and non-constituent members may be excluded from some votes.

The membership of the combined authority is as follows:

First elected on 3 May 2018

Local enterprise partnership
The Sheffield City Region Local Enterprise Partnership was established in 2012. The local enterprise partnership covers the nine local authority areas.

The Sheffield City Region Enterprise Zone includes sites spread over Barnsley, Doncaster, Rotherham, Sheffield and Markham Vale, Derbyshire. In August 2011 the government announced the creation of the zone, which included the existing Advanced Manufacturing Park in Rotherham. The zone was actually set up in 2012. In March 2014 more sites were added, increasing the zone's total area by around half. These included the addition of a site at Doncaster Sheffield Airport.

References

External links
Sheffield City Region
Sheffield City Region Inward Investment
 Moving Forward: The Northern Way

Combined authorities
Local government in South Yorkshire
Geography of South Yorkshire
Geography of Derbyshire
Local enterprise partnerships
Geography of Nottinghamshire